Casperson may refer to:

Casperson, Minnesota, an unincorporated community, United States
W. Casperson House, Delaware, United States
Lee Casperson (born 1944), American physicist and engineer
Senator Casperson (disambiguation)
Carl B. Casperson (1877–1953), Wisconsin State Senate
Tom Casperson (1959–2020), Michigan State Senate